is a professional Japanese baseball player. He plays pitcher for the Hiroshima Toyo Carp.

References 

1995 births
Living people
Baseball people from Hyōgo Prefecture
Japanese baseball players
Nippon Professional Baseball pitchers
Hiroshima Toyo Carp players
Chubu Gakuin University alumni
Sportspeople from Amagasaki